Germán González García (born 26 January 1952) is a Colombian football manager.

Career
Born in Bogotá, González joined local side Santa Fe at age 16, where he played as a central defender, and won the 1975 Campeonato Profesional championship with Santa Fe. As a manager, he led Santa Fe to the 2009 Copa Colombia title.

After he retired from playing football, González studied business administration, but did not complete his degree. Instead, he began coaching youth football, eventually leading Santa Fe's under-23 side. After success with Santa Fe's youth side, he was appointed technical director of Deportes Tolima in 1991, his first professional football management position.

References

1952 births
Living people
Sportspeople from Bogotá
Colombian footballers
Categoría Primera A players
Independiente Santa Fe footballers
Colombian football managers
Categoría Primera A managers
Deportes Tolima managers
Cúcuta Deportivo managers
Independiente Santa Fe managers
Real Cartagena managers
Asociación Civil Deportivo Lara managers
Llaneros Escuela de Fútbol managers